Meiocardia delicata is a species of bivalve in the family Glossidae.

Taxonomy
Lovell Augustus Reeve described this species in 1845, placing it in the genus Isocardia.

In 1994, S. Kosuge & T. Kase described a junior synonym M. delicata; this was synonymized in 1995 by Akihiko Matsukuma and Tadashige Habe.

Reeve gave this species the specific epithet vulgaris "common" to reflect "the abundant importation of this once rare and highly praised shell."

Distribution
The type locality of M. vulgaris and its junior synonym are China and Okinawa, Japan, respectively.

Its distribution includes: China, Taiwan, the Philippines, Malaysia, Indonesia, Queensland, Australia, the Andaman Islands, Myanmar, Northeast India, Oman, Zanzibar and Madagascar.

References

Further reading

External links

 

Glossidae
Bivalves described in 1845